Linyphantes is a genus of North American dwarf spiders that was first described by Ralph Vary Chamberlin & Vaine Wilton Ivie in 1942.

Species
 it contains nineteen species and one subspecies, found in Canada, Mexico, and the United States:
Linyphantes aeronauticus (Petrunkevitch, 1929) (type) – USA
Linyphantes aliso Chamberlin & Ivie, 1942 – USA
Linyphantes anacortes Chamberlin & Ivie, 1942 – USA
Linyphantes delmarus Chamberlin & Ivie, 1942 – USA
Linyphantes distinctus Chamberlin & Ivie, 1942 – USA
Linyphantes eureka Chamberlin & Ivie, 1942 – USA
Linyphantes laguna Chamberlin & Ivie, 1942 – USA
Linyphantes microps Chamberlin & Ivie, 1942 – USA
Linyphantes natches Chamberlin & Ivie, 1942 – USA
Linyphantes nehalem Chamberlin & Ivie, 1942 – USA
Linyphantes nigrescens Chamberlin & Ivie, 1942 – USA
Linyphantes obscurus Chamberlin & Ivie, 1942 – USA
Linyphantes orcinus (Emerton, 1917) – USA, Canada
Linyphantes pacificus (Banks, 1906) – USA
Linyphantes pacificus Chamberlin & Ivie, 1942 – USA
Linyphantes pualla Chamberlin & Ivie, 1942 – USA, Canada
Linyphantes santinez Chamberlin & Ivie, 1942 – USA
Linyphantes s. verdugo Chamberlin & Ivie, 1942 – USA
Linyphantes tragicus (Banks, 1898) – Mexico
Linyphantes victoria Chamberlin & Ivie, 1942 – Canada

See also
 List of Linyphiidae species (I–P)

References

Araneomorphae genera
Linyphiidae
Spiders of North America